Elizabeth Hodgson (1814 – 26 December 1877) was a botanist and geologist whose research was focused on the Furness area of Lancashire (now present-day Cumbria).

Life and career
Hodgson was born in 1814. Her father was James Hodgson, a captain of the Royal Navy. 

She lived in Ulverston, Lancashire and studied the geology of the Lake District. Her first paper about the area was published in 1863 in the Quarterly Journal of the Geological Society, and it was written about fossils found in iron ore mines near Ulverston. In the seven years after its publication, she wrote other papers on the geology, paleontology and glaciology of the Lake District, most of which were published in the Geological Magazine. 

Hodgson also contributed papers to the Geologist, and was a member of the Botanical Exchange Club.

After her health declined and she was unable to continue making scientific collections, Hodgson died on 26 December 1877, at 64 years old.

Selected works
"Flora of Lake Lancashire" in the Journal of Botany, British and Foreign (1874)

References

Botanists active in Europe
19th-century geologists
Women geologists
Women botanists
1814 births
1877 deaths